Daithane Gunjal is a village in Parner taluka in Ahmednagar district of state of Maharashtra, India.

Religion 
The majority of the population in the village is Hindu.

Economy 
The majority of the population has farming as their primary occupation.

Khandoba is kuldayvat of Daithane Gunjal people. One of the best temples was built by village people which is cost up to 2 crore.  Most people visit to this place, which is very near to Hiware Bajar. Big festival is held in month of February.

Postal 
Pin: 414103

References 

Villages in Parner taluka
Villages in Ahmednagar district